Pascal Perrault (born 1959) is a French professional poker player, who specialises in tournament play.  His nickname "Triple P" is short for Pascal "Poison" Perrault, a reference to his other profession as a pharmacist.

He first made the money in the World Series of Poker (WSOP) in 1998, where he made the final table of the $3,000 No Limit Hold-Em tournament and won $14,250 after outlasting opposition including Liam Flood and Chris Ferguson. The next year he finished on the final table again, outlasting the likes of Noel Furlong and Scotty Nguyen.

Soon after he entered into the Late Night Poker television series, where he reached the semi-final in series 4 and the grand final in series 5.

He was voted Poker Personality of the Year in 2001 and was ranked #1 player in Europe in the same year.

In March 2005 he won the Vienna event of the European Poker Tour, taking home a €184,500 first prize.  Later, he made the Grand Final of the inaugural William Hill Poker Grand Prix, where he finished in 4th place.

His girlfriend is fellow player Lise Vigezzi, with whom he has a daughter named Vegas.

As of 2014, his total live tournament winnings exceed $1,675,000.

References

External links
 Pascal Perrault's Poker Team
 Pascal Perrault's School of Poker 

European Poker Tour winners
French poker players
Living people
1959 births